Lenhart is a surname. Notable people with the surname include:

Amanda Lenhart, senior research specialist at the Pew Internet & American Life Project
Heidi Lenhart (born 1973), American actress
Julius Lenhart (1875–1962), Austrian gymnast
Steven Lenhart (born 1986), American soccer player
Zdeněk Lenhart (born 1948), orienteering competitor who competed for Czechoslovakia